Luís Manuel Ferreira de Castro (born 7 May 1980) is a Portuguese football manager currently in charge of Benfica B in Liga Portugal 2.

Career
Castro was born in Moreira de Cónegos, Braga District, and began his managerial career with the under-10 squad at Vizela. In 2005, he was invited by Moreirense to be their youth coordinator and manager of the under-19 squad.

In 2009, after a year in charge of the under-14s of the Braga Football Association, Castro returned to Vizela. In 2011, he moved abroad and took over the under-15 team of Saudi club Al Nassr FC.

Castro returned to his home country in 2012, after being named manager of Vitória de Guimarães' under-15 squad. He then took over the under-19s and worked as a youth coordinator before moving to Hungary in July 2016, with Debreceni VSC.

In 2017, Castro returned to Vitória de Guimarães under the same role, and was also in charge of the under-23s in the 2018–19 season. On 30 May 2019, he was named manager of Super League Greece side Panetolikos.

On 11 October 2019, Castro was sacked by Panetolikos, and joined Benfica on 27 November, after being named manager of the under-23s. On 2 June 2022, after leading the under-19s to the UEFA Youth League title, he took over the B-team, before winning the Under-20 Intercontinental Cup with under-20s.

Honours
Benfica
Campeonato Nacional de Juniores: 2021–22
UEFA Youth League: 2021–22
Under-20 Intercontinental Cup: 2022

References

External links

1980 births
Living people
Portuguese football managers
Super League Greece managers
Panetolikos F.C. managers
S.L. Benfica B managers
Portuguese expatriate football managers
Portuguese expatriate sportspeople in Saudi Arabia
Portuguese expatriate sportspeople in Hungary
Portuguese expatriate sportspeople in Greece
Expatriate football managers in Greece
S.L. Benfica non-playing staff